Gary Clayton Burrill (born 1955) is a Canadian politician and was the leader of the Nova Scotia New Democratic Party from 2016 until 2022. He served as leader during two Nova Scotia general elections in 2017 and 2021. He announced he'd be stepping down as leader after the 2021 election and was succeeded by Claudia Chender on June 25, 2022.

Early life and education
Born in Woodstock, New Brunswick, his father was a United Church minister. In 1978, he graduated from Queen's University with a Masters of Arts in History. Burrill taught sociology at Mount Saint Vincent University, Saint Mary's University, and the Maritime School of Social Work. He later graduated with a Masters of Divinity from Harvard University, and in 1992 he was ordained as a minister in the United Church of Canada and became a minister in Upper Musquodoboit.

Political career
He was elected to the Nova Scotia House of Assembly in the 2009 provincial election. He represented the riding of Colchester-Musquodoboit Valley as a member of the New Democratic Party until his defeat in the 2013 election.

Burrill was the ministerial assistant for the Minister of Community Services (Housing), and chair of the Veteran's Affairs Committee of the Nova Scotia Legislature, in the government of Darrell Dexter.

On June 11, 2015, Burrill announced he was running for the leadership of the Nova Scotia New Democratic Party. On February 27, 2016, Burrill was elected as leader of the party, winning on the second counting of ballots in the instant-runoff voting system used for this election.

In July 2016, Burrill announced that he would seek the NDP nomination in Halifax Chebucto for the 2017 election. He defeated Joachim Stroink in the election to return to the legislature. Under Burrill's leadership in the 2017 election, the NDP took seven seats, the same number the party received on election night in 2013 but two more than it held going into the election.

In the August 2021 provincial election, Burrill was re-elected, along with five other NDP MLAs, all women. On November 9, 2021, Burrill announced he would step down as party leader, but would remain on until a new leader was chosen at a convention within the year.  On May 21, 2022 registration closed for the leadership race, with Claudia Chender being the sole candidate to replace Burrill. She was confirmed as leader after a general membership vote on June 25, 2022 in Dartmouth and Burrill then formally stepped down as leader.

Electoral record

References

1955 births
21st-century Canadian politicians
Leaders of the Nova Scotia CCF/NDP
Living people
Ministers of the United Church of Canada
Nova Scotia New Democratic Party MLAs
People from Colchester County
People from Woodstock, New Brunswick
Harvard Divinity School alumni
Academic staff of Mount Saint Vincent University
Academic staff of the Saint Mary's University (Halifax)